A tenement is a type of building shared by multiple dwellings, typically with flats or apartments on each floor and with shared entrance stairway access. They are common on the British Isles, particularly in Scotland. In the medieval Old Town, in Edinburgh, tenements were developed with each apartment treated as a separate house, built on top of each other (such as Gladstone's Land). Over hundreds of years, custom grew to become law concerning maintenance and repairs, as first formally discussed in Stair's 1681 writings on Scots property law. In Scotland, these are now governed by the Tenements Act, which replaced the old Law of the Tenement and created a new system of common ownership and procedures concerning repairs and maintenance of tenements. Tenements with one or two room flats provided popular rented accommodation for workers, but in some inner-city areas, overcrowding and maintenance problems led to shanty towns, which have been cleared and redeveloped. In more affluent areas, tenement flats form spacious privately owned houses, some with up to six bedrooms, which continue to be desirable properties.

In the United States, the term tenement initially meant a large building with multiple small spaces to rent. As cities grew in the nineteenth century, there was increasing separation between rich and poor. With rapid urban growth and immigration, overcrowded houses with poor sanitation gave tenements a reputation as shanty towns. 
The expression "tenement house" was used to designate a building subdivided to provide cheap rental accommodation, which was initially a subdivision of a large house. Beginning in the 1850s, purpose-built tenements of up to six stories held several households on each floor. Various names were introduced for better dwellings, and eventually modern apartments predominated in American urban living.

In parts of England, especially Devon and Cornwall, the word refers to an outshot, or additional projecting part at the back of a terraced house, normally with its own roof.

History

The term tenement originally referred to tenancy and therefore to any rented accommodation. The New York State legislature defined it in the Tenement House Act of 1867 in terms of rental occupancy by multiple households, as

In Scotland, it continues to be the most common word for a multiple-occupancy building, but elsewhere it is used as a pejorative in contrast to apartment building or block of flats.  Tenement houses were either adapted or built for the working class as cities industrialized, and came to be contrasted with middle-class apartment houses, which started to become fashionable later in the 19th century. Late-19th-century social reformers in the US were hostile to both tenements (for fostering disease, and immorality in the young) and apartment houses (for fostering "sexual immorality, sloth, and divorce").

Specific places

New York

As the United States industrialized during the 19th century, immigrants and workers from the countryside were housed in former middle-class houses and other buildings, such as warehouses, which were bought up and divided into small dwellings. Beginning as early as the 1830s in New York City's Lower East Side or possibly the 1820s on Mott Street, three- and four-story buildings were converted into "railroad flats," so called because the rooms were linked together like the cars of a train, with windowless internal rooms. The adapted buildings were also known as "rookeries," and these were a particular concern, as they were prone to collapse and fire. Mulberry Bend and Five Points were the sites of notorious rookeries that the city worked for decades to clear. In both rookeries and purpose-built tenements, communal water taps and water closets (either privies or "school sinks," which opened into a vault that often became clogged) were squeezed into the small open spaces between buildings. In parts of the Lower East Side, buildings were older and had courtyards, generally occupied by machine shops, stables, and other businesses.

Such tenements were particularly prevalent in New York, where in 1865 a report stated that 500,000 people lived in unhealthy tenements, whereas in Boston in 1845, less than a quarter of workers were housed in tenements. One reason New York had so many tenements was the large number of immigrants; another was that the grid plan on which streets were laid out, and the economic practice of building on individual 25- by 100-foot lots, combined to produce high land coverage. Prior to 1867, tenements often covered more than 90 percent of the lot, were five or six stories high, and had 18 rooms per floor, of which only two received direct sunlight. Yards were a few feet wide and often filled with privies. Interior rooms were unventilated.

Early in the 19th century, many of the poor were housed in cellars, which became even less sanitary after the Croton Aqueduct brought running water to wealthier New Yorkers: the reduction in well use caused the water table to rise, and the cellar dwellings flooded. Early housing reformers urged the construction of tenements to replace cellars, and beginning in 1859 the number of people living in cellars began to decline.

The Tenement House Act of 1866, the state legislature's first comprehensive legislation on housing conditions, prohibited cellar apartments unless the ceiling was 1 foot above street level; required one water closet per 20 residents and the provision of fire escapes; and paid some attention to space between buildings. This was amended by the Tenement House Act of 1879, known as the Old Law, which required lot coverage of no more than 65 percent. As of 1869, New York State law defined a “tenement house” as “any house or building, or portion thereof, which is rented, leased let or hired out, to be occupied, or is occupied as the home or residence of three families or more living independently of each other, and doing their cooking upon the premises, or by more than two families upon any floor, so living and cooking, but having a right in the halls, stairways, yards, water-closets or privies, or some of them.” L 1867, ch 908. The New York City Board of Health was empowered to enforce these regulations, but it declined to do so. As a compromise, the "Old Law tenement" became the standard: this had a "dumbbell" shape, with air and light shafts on either side in the center (usually fitted to the shafts in the adjacent buildings), and it typically covered 80 percent of the lot. James E. Ware is credited with the design; he had won a contest the previous year held by Plumber and Sanitary Engineer Magazine to find the most practical improved tenement design, in which profitability was the most important factor to the jury.

Public concern about New York tenements was stirred by publication in 1890 of Jacob Riis's How the Other Half Lives , and in 1892 by Riis's The Children of the Poor.  The New York State Assembly Tenement House Committee report of 1894 surveyed 8,000 buildings with approximately 255,000 residents and found New York to be the most densely populated city in the world, at an average of 143 people per acre, with part of the Lower East Side having 800 residents per acre, denser than Bombay. It used both charts and photographs, the first such official use of photographs. Together with the publication in 1895 by the US Department of Labor of a special report on housing conditions and solutions elsewhere in the world, The Housing of Working People, it ultimately led to the passage of the Tenement House Act of 1901, known as the New Law, which implemented the Tenement House Committee's recommendation of a maximum of 70 percent lot coverage and mandated strict enforcement, specified a minimum of 12 feet for a rear yard and 6 feet for an air and light shaft at the lot line or 12 feet in the middle of the building (all of these being increased for taller buildings), and required running water and water closets in every apartment and a window in every room. There were also fire-safety requirements. These rules are still the basis of New York City law on low-rise buildings, and they have made single-lot development uneconomical.

Most of the purpose-built tenements in New York were not slums, although they were not pleasant to be inside, especially in hot weather, so people congregated outside, made heavy use of the fire escapes, and slept in summer on fire escapes, roofs, and sidewalks.

The Lower East Side Tenement Museum, a five-story brick former tenement building in Manhattan that is a National Historic Site, is a museum devoted to tenements in the Lower East Side.

Other famous tenements in the US include tenement housing in Chicago,  in which various housing areas were built to the same affect as tenements in New York.

Edinburgh and Glasgow

Tenements make up a large percentage of the housing stock of Edinburgh and Glasgow in Scotland. Glasgow tenements were built to provide high-density housing for the large number of people immigrating to the city in the 19th and early 20th century as a result of the Industrial Revolution, when the city's population boomed to more than 1 million people. Edinburgh's tenements are much older, dating from the 17th century onwards, and some were up to 15 storeys high when first built, which made them among the tallest houses in the world at that time. Glasgow tenements were generally built no taller than the width of the street on which they were located; therefore, most are about 3–5 storeys high. Virtually all Glasgow tenements were constructed using red or blonde sandstone, which has become distinctive.

In Edinburgh, residential dwellings in the UNESCO World Heritage Sites of the medieval Old Town and Georgian New Town (as well as the Victorian city centre districts immediately surrounding them) are almost exclusively tenements.
The Tenement House historic house museum in the Garnethill area of Glasgow preserves the interior, fittings and equipment of a well-kept, upper middle-class tenement from the late 19th century.

Many tenements in Glasgow were demolished in the 1960s and 1970s because of slum conditions, overcrowding and poor maintenance of the buildings. Perhaps the most striking case of this is seen in the Gorbals, where virtually all the tenements were demolished to make way for tower blocks, many of which have in turn have been demolished and replaced with newer structures. The Gorbals is an area of approximately 1 km2 and at one time had an estimated 90,000 people living in its tenements, leading to very poor living conditions. The population now is roughly 10,000.

Tenement demolition was to a significantly lesser extent in Edinburgh, thus making its later World Heritage designations in 1985 possible. Largely, such clearances were limited to pre-Victorian buildings outwith the New Town area and were precipitated by the so-called "Penny Tenement" incident of 1959 in which a tenement collapsed.

Apartments in tenement buildings in both cities are now often highly sought after, due to their locations, often large rooms, high ceilings, ornamentation and period features.

Berlin
 
In German, the term corresponding to tenement is Mietskaserne, "rental barracks", and the city especially known for them is Berlin. In 1930, Werner Hegemann's polemic Das steinerne Berlin (Stony Berlin) referred to the city in its subtitle as "the largest tenement city in the world." They were built during a period of great increases in population between 1860 and 1914, particularly after German unification in 1871, in a broad ring enclosing the old city center, sometimes called the Wilhelmian or Wilhelmine Ring. The buildings are almost always five stories high because of the mandated maximum height. The blocks are large because the streets were required to be able to handle heavy traffic, and the lots are therefore also large: required to have courtyards large enough for a fire truck to turn around, the buildings have front, rear, and cross buildings enclosing several courtyards. Buildings within the courtyards were the location of much of Berlin's industry until the 1920s, and noise and other nuisances affected the apartments, only the best of which had windows facing the street.

Between 1901 and 1920, a Berlin clinic investigated and documented in photographs the living conditions of its patients, revealing that many lived in damp basements and garrets, spaces under stairs, and apartments where the windows were blocked by courtyard businesses.

Many apartments in the Wilhelmian Ring were very small, only one room and a kitchen. Also, apartments were laid out with their rooms reached via a common internal corridor, which even the Berlin Architects' Association recognized was unhealthy and detrimental to family life. Sanitation was inadequate: in a survey of one area in 1962, only 15 percent of apartments had both a toilet and a bath or shower; 19 percent had only a toilet, and 66 percent shared staircase toilets. Heating was provided by stoves burning charcoal briquettes.

Dublin

By the 19th and early 20th century, Dublin's tenements were infamous, often described as the worst in Europe. Many tenement buildings were originally the Georgian townhouses of upper-class families, neglected and subdivided over the centuries to house dozens of Dublin's poor. Henrietta Street's fifteen buildings housed 835 people. In 1911 nearly 26,000 families lived in inner-city tenements, and 20,000 of these families lived in a single room. Disease was common, with death rates of 22.3 per thousand (compared with 15.6 for London at the same time).

The collapse of 65–66 Church Street in 1913, which killed seven residents, led to inquiries into housing. A housing committee report of 1914 said,

Tenement life often appeared in fiction, such as the "Dublin trilogy" of plays by Seán O'Casey, Oliver St. John Gogarty's play Blight, and James Plunkett's novel Strumpet City (adapted for television in 1980). 14 Henrietta Street serves as a museum of Dublin tenement life.

The last tenements were closed in the 1970s, families being rehoused in new suburbs such as Ballymun.

Buenos Aires

In Buenos Aires the tenements, called conventillos, developed from subdividing one- or two-story houses built around courtyards for well-off families. These were long and narrow, three to six times as long as they were wide, and the size of the patios was reduced until as many as 350 people could be living on a lot that had originally housed 25. Purpose-built tenements copied their form. By 1907 there were some 2,500 conventillos, with 150,000 occupants. El conventillo de la Paloma was particularly famous and is the title of a play by Alberto Vaccarezza.

Mumbai

"Chawls" are found in India. They are typically four to five story buildings with 10 to 20 kholis (tenements) on each floor, kholis literally meaning 'rooms'. Many chawl buildings can be found in Mumbai, where chawls were constructed by the thousands to house people migrating to the large city because of its booming cotton mills and overall strong economy.

A typical chawl tenement consists of one all-purpose room, which functions both as a living and sleeping space, and a kitchen which also serves as a dining room. A frequent practice is for the kitchen to also serve as a bedroom for a newly married couple in order to give them some degree of privacy.

Poland

Kamienica (plural kamienice) is a Polish term describing a type of residential tenement building made of brick or stone, with at least two floors. There are two basic types: one designed as a single-family residence, which existed until the 1800s (a burgher house), and the other designed as multi-family housing, which emerged in the 19th century and was the basic type of housing in cities. From the architectural point of view, the word is usually used to describe a building that abuts other similar buildings forming the street frontage, in the manner of a terraced house. The ground floor often consists of shops and other businesses, while the upper floors are apartments, oftentimes spanning the entire floor. Kamienice have large windows in the front, but not in the side walls, since the buildings are close together.  

The first type of kamienica is most prevalent especially in centers of historical cities such as Kraków, Poznań, Wrocław, and Toruń, whereas the second type is most prominent in Łódź. The name derives from the Polish word kamień (stone) and dates from the 15th century. Late 19th century and early 20th century kamienice often took form of city palaces with ornamental facades, high floors and spacious, representative and heavily decorated interiors. 

Later in the 20th century, especially after the Second World War, large apartments would be divided into several smaller flats due to general lack of habitable space caused by vast destruction of cities, thus lowering the generally high standard of living in so-called grand city tenements. Examples of kamienice include Korniakt Palace and Black Kamienica in Lviv. Some kamienice in some areas have a reputation for being inhabited by poor people and families that depend on government money and welfare programs to support them; kamienice are often used as public housing. Those areas are often considered dangerous. The buildings are often neglected, in bad shape (both the exteriors and the interiors), in need of general renovations, sometimes without access to heating or hot water.

See also

 Cortiço, tenements in Portuguese-speaking countries
 NIMBY
 Urban decay

References

Notes

Bibliography
Bauman, John F. "Introduction: The Eternal War on the Slums," From Tenements to the Taylor Homes: In Search of an Urban Housing Policy in Twentieth-Century America, ed. John F. Bauman, Roger Biles, and Kristin M. Szylvian, University Park: Pennsylvania State University, 2000, pp. 1–17.
Elkins, T. H. with Hofmeister, B. Berlin: The Spatial Structure of a Divided City, London/New York: Methuen, 1988, 
Girouard, Mark. Cities and People: A Social and Architectural History, New Haven, Connecticut/London: Yale University, 1985, 
Plunz, Richard A. "On the Uses and Abuses of Air: Perfecting the New York Tenement, 1850–1901," Berlin/New York: Like and Unlike: Essays on Architecture and Art from 1870 to the Present, ed. Josef Paul Kleihues and Christina Rathgeber, New York: Rizzoli, 1993, pp. 159–79.
Riis, Jacob. The Children of the Poor: A Child Welfare Classic, Pittsburgh: TCB Classics, 2018 [1892], 
Worbs, Dietrich. "The Berlin Mietskaserne and Its Reforms," Berlin/New York, pp. 144–57.

Further reading
 Huchzermeyer, Marie. Tenement cities: from 19th century Berlin to 21st century Nairobi, Trenton, New Jersey: Africa World Press, 2011, .
 Kearns, Kevin C. Dublin Tenement Life: An Oral History of the Dublin Slums, Dublin: Gill & Macmillan, 1994, repr. 2006, .
 Lubove, Roy. The Progressives and the Slums: Tenement House Reform in New York City, 1890–1917, Pittsburgh: University of Pittsburgh Press, 1963, .
 Worsdall, Frank. The Tenement: A Way of Life: A Social, Historical and Architectural Study of Housing in Glasgow, Glasgow: W. and R. Chambers, 1979, .

Historiography
 Polland, Annie. "Ivory Towers and Tenements: American Jewish History, Scholars and the Public," American Jewish History 98 (2014) 41-47: how museums interpret the tenements in New York City.
 Steinberg, Adam. "What we talk about when we talk about food: Using food to teach history at the Tenement Museum," Public Historian 34.2 (2012) 79-89.

External links

Kamienice category at Polish Wikipedia

Urban design
House types
Progressive Era in the United States